L&T may refer to:

Larsen & Toubro, a large Indian engineering and construction conglomerate
Lord & Taylor, the oldest department store chain in the United States

See also
LT (disambiguation)